Pandora International  is a maker of hardware and software systems for video editing, Telecine Control and Colour Correction. Pandora was founded in 1985 By Steve Brett and Martin Greenwood, later Aine Marsland joined the team and took over the administration of the company. Pandora International devices are able to colour-correct video and 16 mm and 35 mm motion picture film in real time. Pandora International is based in Greenhithe, Kent, England.

Pogle Colour corrector 
Pandora Int. was the maker the Pogle colour corrector controller. The Pogle can control a Telecine machine, like the FDL60 the first digital telecine. New models could control FDL 90, Quadra and Spirit DataCines Pogle used customized external control panels. The Pogle also included a VTR deck controller which was capable of controlling up to four video tape decks for field accurate editing including 3/2 sequence control. Other systems made do with a separate computer system [e.g. TLC] for this function. 
Pogle has a CPU rack which used twin Motorola 68020 CPU's and a telecine interface rack which varied depending on the make and model of the Telecine system in use.
The first Pogles controlled the telecine's internal colour corrector. 
Originally Pogles used a PDOS operating system which was quickly replaced with a proprietary system named ANDIX. The program and list are stored on a SCSI hard disk, with backup to a 3.5" floppy disk. Video display is to a multi-sync monitor. The newer operating system updated to a Silicon Graphics (SGI) platinum operating system ran on a SGI Indy computer and later an SGI O2; these replaced the internal CPU and video cards in the Pogle controller rack. The Indy computer and O2 computer's backup is usually to an external zip Drive or ext. floppy. The O2 has an internal CD-ROM. Pandora's DCP external colour corrector is a Rec. 601 digital system so some telecine's [e.g. FDL60] which only had analog output's had to first send their signal to an external analog-to-digital converter.

DCP 
DCP or Digital Color Processor was a standard-definition digital video processor controlled by a Pogle. DCP was one of the first commercially available systems which was built entirely with digital circuitry using programmable logic. Until this time most color manipulation [including the circuitry within Telecine machines] was predominantly analog. With the DCP, primary [e.g. Lift/Gamma/Gain] and secondary [Zonal and Hue based] colour processing could be done outside the telecine and so input could be from film or video tape. Standard definition processing was of NTSC and PAL video.
The DCP was a modular system so over the life of the product various add-on's and upgrades were made including the "Electric Sunroof" option. This was launched in direct competition to the "Power Windows" feature from DaVinci System in Florida. It enabled multiple secondary colour corrections to be applied each within a separate area of the image. ESR windows featured an advanced keying system which allowed the user to identify the areas of the image using Hue, Saturation and Luminance keys combined with the physical position of pixels on the screen.

PiXi 
The Pixi Colour Corrector was launched in 1995 and replaced the DCP. Pixi was a High Definition colour corrector and so could handle video resolutions up to 1920x1080 at 30 frames per second. The feature set was similar to the DCP but upgraded in many ways. For example, the Pixi also provided circularly shaped windows and vignettes rather than just squares and rectangles.

A version of Pixi was incorporated into the Picasso system from Post Impressions Ltd (later purchased by Snell & Wilcox). This was an HDTV capable disk server designed to handle 10bit RGB signals.  Industrial Light & Magic purchased one of these systems for use on Star Wars episode I "The Phantom Menace" and another for episode II "Attack of the Clones".

MegaDEF 
In 1997, Pandora introduced the MegaDEF system. MegaDEF uses two PiXi chassis with an additional multiplexer rack. 
MegaDef was the first commercially available system that was capable of working at full 2K resolution [2048 x 1556] in real time [up to 30fps].
The MegaDEF could be used with both the Spirit DataCine and the Specter VDC-2000 virtual telecine. MegaDEF was controlled with a Pogle Platinum controller. In the virtual telecine this data was playing off a Storage area network - SAN through the VDC-2000.
What many people do not realise is that MegaDef connected to the Spirit or Specter machines internally using a special interface that was jointly developed by Philips [manufacturer of Spirit] and Pandora. This meant that the images from film [or disk] were always processed at full 2K resolution before being converted to HDTV or SDTV formats. In this way the accuracy of the internal keyer's and other image processing was greatly enhanced as they were in effect always over sampling the video image.

The 1998 Movie Pleasantville (film) was processed using a MegaDef system, this featured many scenes in which selected colours were removed.
 Specter - VDC - Virtual DataCine. In 1999 Philips introduced the Specter the first virtual telecine. It is able to colour correct, re-size and grain reduce 2K DPX files in real time. Used in DI work and to make multiple video formats off one film transfer scan (PAL, NTSC, Pan scan, letter box...). This was accomplished by playing the DPX files back through the Spirit Datacine's process electronics and a Pandora  MegaDef Colour Correction system.
The 2000 movie O Brother, Where Art Thou? was scanned with Spirit Datacine, colour-corrected with a VDC-2000 using a Pandora Int. Pogle Colour Corrector with MegaDEF at Kodak's Hollywood Cinesite facility. A Kodak Lightning II film recorder was used to record the data output back to film. This process helped change the trees and grass backgrounds from green to a yellow/brown, creating the 1930s "Dustbowl" effect wanted by the Coen Brothers and cinematographer Roger Deakins.

Pandora was awarded an Emmy in 2001 for MegaDef in recognition of its pioneering work in developing the concept of Digital Intermediate.

Other versions of MegaDef were interfaced to the Quantel iQ system using an optical fiber using a proprietary connection protocol known as "FreeFlow". This system was also capable of operating in real time at 2048x1556 resolutions as well as standard TV formats. Systems were purchased by Peter Jackson's Company "Film Unit" in New Zealand during the filming of the Lord of the Rings trilogy.

Current products

Evolution - Pandora Pogle Colour Suite Controller
Evolution - Pandora Pogle Colour Suite Controller is a Telecine controller.

Pluto Colour Management System
Pluto is a LUT management tool.

Revolution
Revolution is the current product; it is a non-linear data grade system.
Revolution is built entirely using Programmable Logic Devices and so it can be programmed to perform different tasks and handle different types of image Data.
Image resolutions of up to 4K [4096x3072] are possible but currently most systems delivered are specified for 2K.
Unlike most of the software based systems currently on the market the Revolution is designed to deliver all image processing in real time. It can be configured to perform up to 50 layers of colour correction, and some layers can also provide, defocus, sharpening and other special effects.  Operational speed is always consistent no matter how many layers are in use at any time.

Photo gallery

See also 
Film Chain
Digital film
Digital cinema
Direct to Disk Recording
Hard disk recorder
Factors causing HDTV Blur.
Test film
Da Vinci Systems
Color grading and editing systems.
Cintel telecine equipment.
Color suite
For means of putting video on film, see telerecording (UK) and kinescope (US).

References

External links
Pandora Pandora International Web site
FDL 60 web site
 DFT Digital Film Technology - Manufacturer of CCD based telecines and data scanners
 History of Telecines
 tig for colorist
 "FDL 60-Progress in Film Scanning Using CCD Sensors and Digital Processing", D. Poetsch et al., `International Broadcast Engineer`, Jan. 1981, pp. 47–49.
BBC2 Repeat Season, Colour Restorations with a Pandora
creativeplanetnetwork.com, DCP emmys
reativeplanetnetwork.com, Piccaso 

Film production
Film and video technology
Television technology
Video hardware